Durie "Uthaimin" Sahasal Kallahal was the mayor of Tuberan in Basilan until 2010. In 2010, he ran for vice-mayor.

He is considered an ally of the family of deceased leader Wahab Akbar.

References

Liberal Party (Philippines) politicians
Mayors of places in Basilan
Living people
Filipino Muslims
Year of birth missing (living people)
Place of birth missing (living people)
21st-century Filipino politicians